Dylan Orr (born 1979) is the Director of the Office of Labor Standards for the City of Seattle, USA. Appointed by Mayor Murray in May 2015, Orr is responsible for enforcing Seattle's historic minimum wage law, as well as its paid sick and safe time law, wage theft law, and fair chance employment law. Previously, Orr was Chief of Staff to Assistant Secretary Kathy Martinez in the Office of Disability Employment Policy. As part of the United States Department of Labor, he contributed to the development of national disability employment-related regulations and policies, including regulations issued under Section 503 of the Rehabilitation Act of 1973. As the Department of Labor representative, he also worked with the White House Office of National AIDS Policy on the implementation of the President's National HIV/AIDS Strategy, in addition to making significant contributions to several federal LGBT policies and regulations. He was recruited to the Administration by the University of Washington School of Law professor and former EEOC Commissioner Paul Steven Miller. Previously, he was Special Assistant/Advisor to Assistant Secretary Martinez. Upon his appointment to his role as Special Assistant in 2009, he became the first openly transgender person appointed to any U.S. presidential administration.

Education
Orr received his Bachelor of Arts in anthropology from Smith College and his Juris Doctor from the University of Washington School of Law. He is a member of the Washington State Bar Association.

Early life and career
Orr was born and raised in Seattle, Washington. He worked at the Conservation Law Foundation and the Department of Children and Families in Massachusetts (formerly the Department of Social Services). After moving back to Seattle, Orr held positions at Marten Law Group, Disability Rights Washington, MacDonald Hoague and Bayless, and Columbia Legal Services. In late 2009, he accepted an appointment to the Obama administration.

Recognition
 LGBT appointments in the Obama-Biden Administration
 2012 Featured in Out Out100: The White House
 2013 Gay Politics Guest Blog: Transgender Day of Remembrance; a Note on HumaniTy
 2013 Community Advocate Award by the Massachusetts Transgender Political Coalition
 2013 Julie Johnson Founder’s Award by the National Center for Transgender Equality
 2014 Best Lawyers Under 40 by the LGBT Bar Association
2015-2016 German Marshall Fund of the United States Marshall Memorial Fellow

References 

1979 births
Living people
Smith College alumni
Transgender men
LGBT appointed officials in the United States
Obama administration personnel
LGBT people from Washington (state)
University of Washington School of Law alumni